A by-election was held for the Australian House of Representatives seat of Bendigo on 7 June 1969. This was triggered by the resignation of Labor MP Noel Beaton. A by-election for the seat of Gwydir was held on the same day.

The by-election was won by Labor candidate David Kennedy.

Key dates

Results

References

1969 elections in Australia
Victorian federal by-elections
1960s in Victoria (Australia)
June 1969 events in Australia